Strzelecki Regional Reserve is a protected area located in the Australian state of South Australia  in the gazetted localities of Lindon and Strzelecki Desert about  north-east of Port Augusta.  It includes the Strzelecki Desert and the dry Strzelecki Creek bed. The regional reserve can only accessed via the historic Strzelecki Track.  It is partly located on land that was included on the List of Wetlands of International Importance under the Ramsar Convention under the name Coongie Lakes in 1987.  The regional reserve is classified as an IUCN Category VI protected area.

See also

 Protected areas of South Australia
 Regional reserves of South Australia
 Regional Reserve (Australia)
 Strzelecki Desert Lakes Important Bird Area

References

External links
Entry for Strzelecki Regional Reserve on protected planet

Regional reserves of South Australia
Protected areas established in 1991
1991 establishments in Australia
Far North (South Australia)